Karnataka State Film Award for Best Supporting Actress is a state film award of the Indian state of Karnataka  given during the annual Karnataka State Film Awards. The award honours Kannada language films.

Superlative Winners

Award winners
The following is the full list of award winners and the name of the films for which they won.

See also
 Cinema of Karnataka
 List of Kannada-language films

References

Karnataka State Film Awards
Kannada-language films